Cammy or Cammie is a nickname (often for Camilla or Cameron) and a given name which may refer to:

People

Male
 Cammy Bell (born 1986), Scottish footballer
 Cameron Boyle, Scottish rugby union player capped for Scotland three times in 1963
 Peter "Cammy" Cammell, former member of the English rock band The La's
 Cammie Fraser (born 1941), Scottish former footballer
 Cammy Fraser (born 1957), Scottish former footballer
 Cameron Glasgow (born 1966), Scottish former rugby union player
 Cammy Kerr (born 1995), Scottish footballer
 Cameron MacDonald (born 1989), Scottish footballer
 Cammie Smith (born 1933), West Indian former cricketer
 Cammy Smith (born 1995), Scottish footballer

Female
 Cammie Dunaway, American business executive
 Cammi Granato (born 1971), American hockey player and Hall of Famer
 Cammie King (1934-2010), American child actress
 Cammie Lusko (born 1958), American bodybuilder
 Cammy MacGregor (born 1968), American former tennis player
 Cammie McGovern, American novelist, younger sister of actress Elizabeth McGovern
 Cammy Myler (born 1968), American former luger

Fictional characters
 Cammy White, in the Street Fighter video game series
 Cammi (character), in Marvel Comics
 Camilla "Cammie" Sheppard, in The A-List (novel series)

See also
 Kammy (disambiguation)

Lists of people by nickname
Hypocorisms
Unisex given names
Lists of people by given name